Tekeli is a surname. People with the surname include:

Osman Nuri Tekeli (1893–?), Turkish bureaucrat
Peter Tekeli (1720–1792), Russian general-in-chief of Serb origin
Resul Tekeli (born 1986), Turkish volleyball player
Sevim Tekeli (1924–2019), Turkish academic
Şirin Tekeli (1944–2017), Turkish academic

See also
Tekeli Lala Mehmed Pasha (died 1595), Ottoman Grand vizier
Tekeli (disambiguation)

Turkish-language surnames
Turkish words and phrases